Classic Style Magazine was a short-lived quarterly men's magazine, first published in early 2007, and folded in 2008, after five issues. The magazine was owned and operated by Michael Key, through his Key Publishing Group.

See also
List of men's magazines

References

External links
 (archived)

Men's magazines published in the United States
Annual magazines published in the United States
Defunct magazines published in the United States
Magazines established in 2006
Men's fashion magazines
Magazines with year of disestablishment missing
Quarterly magazines published in the United States

Creators 

Michael Key
Matt Deckard